The Attorney is a 2013 South Korean courtroom drama film directed and co-written by Yang Woo-suk in his directorial debut.

It was inspired by the real-life "Burim case" of 1981 when, during the authoritarian Chun Doo-hwan regime, 22 students, teachers and office workers who belonged to a book club were arrested without warrants on fabricated charges that they were North Korea sympathizers. Roh Moo-hyun, then a tax lawyer from Busan, formed a legal team with his allies, including Moon Jae-in and Kim Kwang-il, to defend the arrested individuals against the government. After the case, Roh became an influential human rights lawyer throughout the 1980s; he later entered politics and became the 16th president of South Korea. Later, Moon Jae-in also became the 19th president of South Korea.

Plot 
In 1978, a former judge named Song moves to Busan to start his own law firm. The other lawyers look down on him because he had passed the bar-examination without ever going to university. Soon, however, he becomes rich from accepting the cases which his colleagues shun, even though they are the most profitable, such as real estate and taxation. Meanwhile, a detective named Cha is given orders from the highest levels of leadership to purge Busan of communists, even if it means resorting to fabrication. A medical officer from a nearby military base, Lt Yoon, is sent to oversee the health of the victims whom Cha's agents will torture.

Years later, in 1981, Song is enjoying his new-found fame and respect, and he even buys a sailboat with the hope of competing in the 1988 Seoul Olympics. One night, while dining at his favorite restaurant with his high school classmates, he gets into a fight with a journalist named Lee who sympathizes with the frequent student protests and claims that the mass media is inherently deceptive. A short time later, a high school student named Park, the son of the restaurant's owner, goes missing. Park's mother, Choi, frantically searches for him for nearly two months, even closing the restaurant, before it is revealed that Park and some other students are to face a trial for sedition.

Realizing that the students' confessions were extracted using torture, Song agrees to take the case. At the trial, he notices a number of violations of the Korean constitution, but is told by the prosecutors and the judge that normal laws do not apply in cases of national security. The prosecutors begin by arguing that the students studied a book called What Is History? by EH Carr. In response, Song gets a note from the British consulate attesting that EH Carr was a British ambassador, not a communist ideologue. Song is stunned, however, when Cha openly lies on the stand and denies that the defendants were tortured, claiming rather brazenly that all of their bruises and other injuries were self-inflicted.

A breakthrough happens when Lt Yoon agrees to testify. Lt Yoon confesses to the court that the defendants were tortured and is willing to describe the methods of their torture in detail. However, Cha reports the situation to his leadership, and they are able to frame Lt Yoon for desertion, thereby nullifying his testimony and sending him off to prison. The case is lost but the judge offers leniency by giving the students 2 years in prison at most.

By 1987, Song is a changed man and has become a protest leader himself. One day he is arrested for his activities and charged with sedition. To his amazement, 99 out of the 142 lawyers in Busan attend his hearing and express their support. Even so, free speech and the rule of law remain controversial subjects in Korea.

Cast

Main
Song Kang-ho as Song Woo-suk
Kim Young-ae as Choi Soon-ae 
Oh Dal-su as Park Dong-ho 
Kwak Do-won as Cha Dong-young
Im Si-wan as Park Jin-woo

Supporting
Lee Sung-min as Lee Yoon-taek 
Jung Won-joong as Attorney Kim Sang-pil 
Song Young-chang as Judge
Jo Min-ki as Prosecutor Kang Young-cheol 
Lee Hang-na as Song Woo-seok's wife
Cha Eun-jae as Miss Moon
Jung Joon-won as Song Gun-woo
Cha Gwang-soo as Park Byeong-ho 
Lee Seon-hee as Evening school student
Ryu Soo-young as Lee Chang-joon (cameo)

Box office 
Within ten days of its release, The Attorney had been seen by over 3.4 million people in South Korea. By the end of the year it became the 8th best-selling local movie of all time.

It reached 7.8 million admissions in 18 days, making it the fastest Korean film to pass 7 million admissions since the 2012 film The Thieves, which did it in 13 days. It became the tenth movie to break the 10 million admissions mark in Korea.

Awards and nominations

References

External links

2013 films
2010s legal drama films
Films set in the 1980s
South Korean legal films
Films about lawyers
2010s Korean-language films
Best Picture Blue Dragon Film Award winners
Roh Moo-hyun
2013 drama films
South Korean films based on actual events
2010s South Korean films